O. grandis may refer to:
 Ocepeia  grandis, an extinct Afrotherian mammal from the Paleocene epoch of Morocco
 Ocyale grandis, a wolf spider species in the genus Ocyale found in Togo, Congo and Namibia
 Oenothera grandis, a herbaceous flowering plant species in the genus Oenothera
 Oldenburgia grandis, a small gnarled tree species found in South Africa
 Onobrychis grandis, a Eurasian perennial herb species in the genus Onobrychis
 Oocorys grandis, a large sea snail species
 Opesia grandis, a fly species in the genus Opesia
 Ophiacodon grandis, an extinct large pelycosaur species found in Joggins, Nova Scotia, Canada and that lived in the early Permian
 Orthogeomys grandis, the giant pocket gopher, a rodent species found in Guatemala, Honduras and Mexico
 Oudenodon grandis, an extinct dicynodont species common throughout southern Africa during the Late Permian

See also
 Grandis (disambiguation)